Lang’e 崀峨 is a Loloish language spoken in 12 villages of Lang’e village cluster in Changhai Township, southwestern Yongsheng County by about 2,500 people.

References

Loloish languages
Languages of China